Paradisiaque is the third album by the French musician MC Solaar, released in 1997.

Critical reception
The Guardian called the album an "erudite but musically uneven variation on le rap francais." The Daily Mirror deemed it "one of the funkiest albums you'll ever hear." Skiing concluded that "Solaar mounts a ferocious lyrical attack, arguably stringing together more rhyming syllables than any other MC at work today."

AllMusic wrote that Solaar's "good sense of melody turns the best moments of the album into fine pop-rap that is entertaining even if you don't understand French."

Track listing
Intro - :32
Paradisiaque - 3:12
Gangster Moderne - 4:05
Tournicoti - 3:49
Zoom - 3:53
Le Sens De La Vie - 4:05
Dakota - 3:58
Illico Presto - 4:23 
Les Temps Changent - 3:18
Daydreamin' - 4:51
Les Boys Bandent - 3:18
Les Pensées Sont Des Flowers - 4:02
Wonderbra (featuring Bambi Cruz) - 4:02
Le 11 Choc - 3:33
Protège-Tibia - 4:12
Quand Le Soleil Devient Froid - 3:51
Outro - :34

Certifications

References

1997 albums
MC Solaar albums